Miss Yekaterinburg annual beauty pageant is held in the city of Yekaterinburg, Russia.

Usually it involves up to four hundred participants in the preliminary round and about thirty members in the main competition. Miss Yekaterinburg 2009 Irina Antonenko won as a prize a Hyundai car. The main competition is usually held in the Young Theatre of the city on August 11.

Winners

Miss Yekaterinburg 1997 Nina Buldakova
Miss Yekaterinburg 1998 Anastasia Melnik
Miss Yekaterinburg 1999 Elena Smyshlyayeva
Miss Yekaterinburg 2000 Eugenia Obraztsova
Miss Yekaterinburg 2001 Irina Vtorushina
Miss Yekaterinburg 2002 Ekaterina Zvereva
Miss Yekaterinburg 2003 Elena Polubedova
Miss Yekaterinburg 2004 Ekaterina Durnova
Miss Yekaterinburg 2005 Anfisa Kulbakova
Miss Yekaterinburg 2006 Darya Dementyeva
Miss Yekaterinburg 2007 Anna Semenova
Miss Yekaterinburg 2008 Ekaterina Popkova
Miss Yekaterinburg 2009 Irina Antonenko became Miss Russia 2010
Miss Yekaterinburg 2010 Nina Savelyeva
Miss Yekaterinburg 2011 Tatiana Neverova
Miss Yekaterinburg 2012 Anna Lesun
Miss Yekaterinburg 2013 Ekaterina Lokshina
Miss Yekaterinburg 2014 Sofia Nikitchuk became Miss Russia 2015
Miss Yekaterinburg 2015 Vladislava Tarasova
Miss Yekaterinburg 2016 Elizaveta Anikhovskaya
Miss Yekaterinburg 2017 Anastasia Kaunova
Miss Yekaterinburg 2018 Arina Verina
Miss Yekaterinburg 2019 Victoria Vershinina
Miss Yekaterinburg 2020 Zlata Pomurzina
Miss Yekaterinburg 2021 Violetta Sarayeva
Miss Yekaterinburg 2022 Tatiana Kuzmina

External links

References

Beauty pageants in Russia
Yekaterinburg
Russian awards
Local Beauty pageants